The discography of Mizraab, a Pakistani progressive rock band, consists of two studio albums, as well as numerous live albums, singles and music videos. The band was formed by lead guitarist and vocalist Faraz Anwar, bassist Khalid Khan and percussionist Akhtar Qayyum in 1996. After the release of the band's first studio album, there had been many changes in the line-up the only consistent member being Faraz himself.

Although Mizraab has been prominent in their home country since the release of their debut album Panchi (1999), they did not achieve fame and commercial success until the release of their second studio album Maazi, Haal, Mustaqbil, which was released in 2004. The album sold over 30,000 copies upon it release and is the band's highest selling album. Singles from the album like "Kitni Sadian" and "Insaan" became an instant hit in Pakistan and did very well at the local music charts. The band produced an overall of five singles along with five music videos for each single from the album, the other singles from the album are "Panchi", "Meri Terhan" and "Izhar". The album is also credited to be the first proper Urdu metal album released in Pakistan.

After the release of their second studio album, Mizraab made a comeback into the lime light with the video for "Ujalon Main" in December 2006, which showcased the new band members as well as the change in genre and was well received all over the country. Mizraab’s third album was completed in late 2006–2007 but due to the dire state of the music industry in Pakistan, no deal could be reached and the album was shelved.

Albums

Studio albums

Live albums

Singles

Music videos

References

External links
Mizraabianz.com - Official Website
Mizraab discography at Official Website

Discography
Discographies of Pakistani artists
Heavy metal group discographies